Rose Osborne (born 19 February 1990) is a British professional racing cyclist who rides for .

See also
 List of 2016 UCI Women's Teams and riders

References

External links
 

1990 births
Living people
British female cyclists
Place of birth missing (living people)
21st-century British women